East Garfield Park is on the West Side of Chicago, Illinois, west of the Loop.

Taking its name from the large urban park, Garfield Park, the neighborhood is bordered by Franklin Boulevard on the north, Arthington and Taylor Streets on the south, Hamlin Avenue and Independence Boulevard to the west, and Rockwell Street to the east.

Demographics

Crime
East Garfield Park has long-standing issues with violent crime and property crime; in 2014, it was ranked 6th out of 77 Community areas in Chicago in violent crime and 10th among Chicago community areas in property crimes. The neighborhood experienced precipitous population decline from its peak of 70,091 at the 1950 census, down over 70% to a low of 19,992 in 2020. The many vacant lots and derelict buildings left behind have exacerbated the crime issues.

Arts and culture
Nearly 20% of the neighborhood is managed by the Chicago Park District, with Garfield Park occupying the northwest corner of the neighborhood. The neighborhood is home to the Garfield Park Conservatory, one of the largest conservatories in the United States.

Government
The East Garfield Park community area has supported the Democratic Party in the past two presidential elections by overwhelming margins. In the 2016 presidential election, the East Garfield Park cast 6,690 votes for Hillary Clinton and cast 141 votes for Donald Trump (96.22% to 2.03%). In the 2012 presidential election, East Garfield Park cast 9,046 votes for Barack Obama and cast 100 votes for Mitt Romney (98.51% to 1.09%).

Education
Chicago Public Schools operates district public schools.

In addition Urban Prep Academies operates the East Garfield Park Campus. Providence St. Mel School, a private school, is in East Garfield Park.

Infrastructure

Transportation
Two of Chicago Transit Authority's train lines, the Blue Line and the Green Line, serves this neighborhood. The Green Line has stations at California, Kedzie, and Central Park Drive. The Blue Line has a station in the neighborhood in the median of the Eisenhower Expressway, Kedzie-Homan.

The neighborhood is also served by the CTA's bus service. East-west bus routes include 20 along Madison Street, 126 along Jackson Street, and 7 along Harrison Street. North-south bus routes include 94 along California Avenue, 52 along Kedzie Avenue, and 82 along Homan Avenue.

Notable people

 Lupe Fiasco (born 1982), Grammy Award-winning rapper & producer 
 Alfonzo McKinnie (born 1992), professional basketball player, currently active for the Chicago Bulls
 Louis J. Sebille (1915–1950), pilot in the United States Army Air Forces and recipient of the Medal of Honor. He resided at 2840 West Washington Street.
 Isiah Thomas (born 1961), former professional basketball player and hall of famer, coach and sports analyst. He was a childhood resident of East Garfield Park living at 3340 West Congress Parkway.

See also

References

External links
 Official City of Chicago East Garfield Park Community Map

Community areas of Chicago
West Side, Chicago